This is a list of songs which reached number one on the Billboard Mainstream Top 40 chart in 2004.

During 2004, a total of 12 singles hit number-one on the charts.

Chart history

References

See also
 2004 in music

Billboard charts
United States Mainstream Top 40
Mainstream Top 40 2004